The Guenguel River is a river of Argentina in Chubut province. It is tributary to the Senguerr river.

See also
List of rivers of Argentina

References
 Rand McNally, The New International Atlas, 1993.
  GEOnet Names Server

Rivers of Chubut Province
Rivers of Argentina